Network Performance Monitor (NPM) is a solution in Operations Management Suite that monitors network performance between office sites, data centers, clouds and applications in near real-time. It helps a network administrator locate and troubleshoot bottlenecks like network delay,  data loss and availability of any network link across on-premises networks, Microsoft Azure VNets, Amazon Web Services VPCs, hybrid networks, VPNs or even public internet links.

About Operations Management Suite
Operations Management Suite (OMS) is a cloud-based solution for IT management that gives operational insights by correlating the logs and performance data collected from any Operating System (Microsoft Windows as well as Linux) or application deployed in cloud (Microsoft Azure or Amazon Web Services) or on-premises.

It monitors IT infrastructure and provides more visibility and control by identifying and assessing security risks, automating administrative tasks using PowerShell, and integrating cloud backups for business continuity.

Network Performance Monitor
Network Performance Monitor (NPM) is a network monitoring solution from the Operations Management Suite, that monitors networks. NPM monitors the availability of connectivity and quality of connectivity between multiple locations within and across campuses, private and public clouds. The solution uses synthetic transactions to test for reachability and can be used on any IP network irrespective of the make and model of network routers or switches deployed.

Features
 A dashboard is generated to display summarized information about the Network including Network health events, unhealthy Network links, and the Subnetwork links with most loss and most latency. Custom dashboards can also be created to find the state of the network at a point-in-time in history.
 An interactive topology map is also generated to show the routes between Nodes. Network administrator can use it to distinguish the unhealthy path to find out the root cause of the issue.
 Alerts can be configured to send e-mails to stakeholders when a threshold is reached. Runbooks can also be triggered to take auto corrective action.

Use cases

Two on-premises networks: Monitor connectivity between two office sites which could be connected using MPLS WAN link or VPN
Multiple sites: Monitor connectivity to a central site from multiple sites. For example: scenarios where users from multiple office locations are accessing applications hosted at a central location
Hybrid Networks: Monitor connectivity between on-premises and Azure VNets that could be connected using S2S VPN or ExpressRoute
Multiple Virtual Networks in Cloud: Monitor connectivity between multiple VNets in same or different Azure regions. These could be peered VNets or Vnets connected using VPN.
Any Cloud: Monitor connectivity between Amazon Web Services and on-premises Networks. And also between Amazon Web Services and Azure VNets.

How Network Performance Monitor works?
The solution does not require any access to network devices. Microsoft Monitoring Agent (MMA) or OMS extension (valid only for Virtual machines hosted in Azure) is to be installed on the servers in the Subnetworks that are to be monitored.

 OMS Agent auto downloads the Network Monitoring Intelligence Packs which spawns NPM agent that detects the subnets it is connected to and this information is sent to OMS.
 NPM Agent gets to know the list of IP address of other agents from OMS.
 NPM Agent IP starts active probes using Internet Control Message Protocol (ICMP) or Transmission Control Protocol (TCP) Ping and the roundtrip time for a ping between two nodes is used to calculate network performance metrics such as packet loss and link latency. This data is pushed to OMS where its used to create customizable dashboard.
A video based demo of NPM is available online.

Synthetic Transactions
NPM uses synthetic transactions to test for reachability and calculate network performance metrics across the network.  Tests are performed using either TCP or ICMP and users have the option of choosing between these protocols.  Users must evaluate their environments and weigh the pros and cons of the protocols. The following is a summary of the differences.

 TCP provides more accurate results compared to ICMP ECHO because routers and switches assign lower priority to ICMP ECHO packets compared to TCP Ping.
 TCP needs configuration of network firewall and local firewall on the computers where agents are installed to allow traffic on default port 8084. Some other port can also be chosen for this.
 ICMP does not need to configure firewall but it needs more agents to provide information about all the paths between two subnets. Consequently, the OMS agent must be installed on more machines in the subnet as compared to when TCP is used.

Timeline
 February 27, 2017
NPM Solution became generally available (GA).  The launch was picked up by eWeek

 July 27, 2016
NPM solution was announced in Public Preview

Operating Systems supported

Windows Server  

 2008 SP 1 or later

Linux Distributions

 CentOS Linux 7
 RedHat Enterprise Linux 7.2
 Ubuntu 14.04 LTS, 15.04, 16.04 LTS
 Debian 8
 SUSE Linux Server 12

Client Operating Systems
Windows 7 SP1 or later

Availability in Regions
Network Performance Monitor is available in the following Azure regions:
 Eastern US
 Western Europe
 South East Asia
 South East Australia
 West Central US
 South UK
 US Gov Virginia

Data collection frequency
TCP handshakes every 5 seconds, data sent every 3 minutes

References 

Servers (computing)
Network management
Network software
Computer performance